South Australian Railways K class may refer to:
 South Australian Railways K class (broad gauge)
 South Australian Railways K class (narrow gauge), a very similar but smaller, lighter variant